Daci'en Temple is a Buddhist temple located in Yanta District, Xi'an, Shaanxi. The temple is the cradle of East Asian Yogācāra in China. It is notable for the Giant Wild Goose Pagoda. The pagoda was originally built by an accomplished monk Xuanzang, whose story was widespread in civil society in many dynasties and the famous legendary story Journey to the West was inspired by his experience. Alongside Daxingshan Temple and Jianfu Temple, it was one of the three sutras translation sites in the Tang dynasty.

History
Located in Jinchangfang of Chang'an (today's Xi'an), the Daci'en Temple was first constructed in 648, in the 22nd year of Zhenguan period of the Tang dynasty (618–907). Prince Li Zhi, the later Emperor Gaozong of Tang, issued the decree building the temple in commemoration of his mother Empress Zhangsun. The renowned Buddhist monk Xuanzang was in charge of the temple, where he founded the East Asian Yogācāra in the Tang Empire. During his tenure, he managed the construction of the Giant Wild Goose Pagoda.

The temple was rebuilt in 1466, in the reign of Chenghua Emperor in the Ming dynasty (1368–1644).

On March 4, 1961, the temple was listed among the first group of the "Major National Historical and Cultural Sites in Shaanxi" by the State Council of China.

In 1983, the temple was authorized as a National Key Buddhist Temple in Han Chinese Area by the State Council of China.

In early 2001, it was categorized as an AAAA level tourist site by the China National Tourism Administration.

On June 22, 2014, the Giant Wild Goose Pagoda was added to UNESCO's list of World Cultural Heritage.

Architecture
The complex include the following halls: Shanmen, Mahavira Hall, Hall of Four Heavenly Kings, Bell tower, Drum tower, Buddhist Texts Library, Xuanzang Sanzang Hall, Giant Wild Goose Pagoda, Pagodas Forest, etc.

Giant Wild Goose Pagoda
The Giant Wild Goose Pagoda, also called the Big Wild Goose Pagoda, the Great Wild Goose Pagoda and Dayan Pagoda. Was built by Xuanzang in 652. The  pagoda has the brick structure with seven stories and four sides of ancient Indian style. It has been renovated and redecorated several times since the Tang dynasty (618–907).

Mahavira Hall
The Mahavira Hall enshrining statues of Vairocana, Mahavairocana and Sakyamuni. The two disciples' statues are placed in front of the statue of Sakyamuni, the older is called Kassapa Buddha and the middle-aged is called Ananda. The statues of Eighteen Arhats sitting on the seats before both sides of the gable walls.

Xuanzang Sanzang Hall
The Xuanzang Sanzang Hall enshrines the Sarira of Xuanzang and houses a copper statue of Xuanzang. On the walls of the hall painted frescoes depict events from Xuanzang's life.

Pagodas Forest
The temple has a history of almost 1400 years, has nine pagodas, which enshrine the Buddhist relics of successive abbots of Daci'en Temple. Their names and birthdates are carved in their pagoda.

National treasure
The temple houses 20 slices of the palm leaf manuscript, which were brought from ancient India by Xuanzang.

References

Bibliography
 
 
 

Buddhist temples in Xi'an
Buildings and structures in Xi'an
Tourist attractions in Xi'an
15th-century establishments in China
15th-century Buddhist temples
Religious buildings and structures completed in 1466